Padonia is an unincorporated community in Padonia Township, Brown County, Kansas, United States.

History
The first settlement at Padonia was made in 1854. The community was named for Jesse Padon, a pioneer settler. A post office was established in Padonia in 1857, and remained in operation until it was discontinued in 1933.

References

Further reading

External links
 Brown County maps: Current, Historic, KDOT

Unincorporated communities in Brown County, Kansas
Unincorporated communities in Kansas
1854 establishments in Kansas Territory